is a Buddhist holiday exclusively celebrated by Japanese sects for seven days; three days before and after both the Spring equinox (shunbun) and Autumnal equinox (shūbun).  It is observed by nearly every Buddhist school in Japan.  The tradition extends from mild weather that occurs during the time of equinoxes, though the origin of the holiday dates from Emperor Shōmu in the 8th century.  People who normally worked in the fields had more leisure time to evaluate their own practices, and to make a renewed effort to follow Buddhism.  The seasons beginning to change is a symbol that Buddhists should change their lives in order to reach enlightenment.  Today, special services are usually observed in Japanese Buddhist temples, and Japanese temples abroad, based on the particular Buddhist tradition or sect.

Origin 
Higan is the Japanese pronunciation of the Chinese translation of the Sanskrit term for "the Other Shore". The cycle of death and rebirth (saṃsāra) is "this shore", and in Buddhism, crossing to the other shore is used to refer to the attainment of nirvana.

Ancestral veneration 
Similar to Obon, Japanese citizens will often return to their hometowns during the holiday season to pay respects to their ancestors. Ohigan is a public holiday, thus many businesses are closed.

See also
Lycoris radiata (Red spider lily) - In Japanese, higan-bana (higan-flower)

References

Buddhist festivals in Japan
Buddhist holidays
March observances
September observances